The Minardi PS03 is a Formula One car used by the Minardi team during the 2003 Formula One season.

Overview
Minardi announced that for the 2003 season, veteran Dutch driver Jos Verstappen and rookie Justin Wilson would race for the team, replacing Alex Yoong who went to ChampCar and Mark Webber who joined Jaguar Racing.  Wilson joined the team after a crowdfunding effort by his father, and former F1 driver Jonathan Palmer after Justin had missed out on a drive with Jordan Grand Prix in 2002 due to his height.  Minardi agreed to make a car that would fit his frame. It was reported at the time both Verstappen and Wilson paid £2million for their drives. Anthony Davidson, who stepped in to drive the PS02 had been linked with a drive, but declined at the cost.heir drives. Matteo Bobbi was retained for a third season as test and development driver for the PS03.

Previous engine supplier Asiatech had gone out of business, and discussions with Ferrari to provide engines were ongoing through late 2002.  Ultimately, the team went with Cosworth engines as the £15million fee for Ferrari engines was too great.  The teams supply issues were apparent again, after Michelin stepped away in November 2002 as tyre supplier, with Jos Verstappen arriving to test in Valencia and Minardi had no tyres for the PS03.  Therefore, Verstappen tested the 2001 PS01 on Avon F3000 tyres.  It would not be until late February 2003 an agreement with Bridgestone was reached. Late in February, Minardi held a test session at Imola Circuit where the second Cosworth powered PS03 chassis was tested for the first time, with Bridgestone tyres.  Just 24 hours before the car would be packed for transit to Australia for the first round.

The PS03 was launched formally in Melbourne, Australia ahead of the first race.

The 2003 season was largely challenging for Minardi. The PS03 secured no points all season and retired from 11 races, including Justin Wilson retiring from the first four races. He suffered from exhaustion and temporary paralysis in the neck during the 2003 Malaysian Grand Prix due to his HANS device coming loose and restricting arm movement inside the PS03 cockpit.  Verstappen had a chance of scoring points at the rain soaked 2003 Brazilian Grand Prix, where a host of drivers including world champion Michael Schumacher retired, but retired on lap 31 due to a spin.

In June 2003, owner Stoddart had purchased five Arrows A23 race cars following the teams administration.  There was speculation that the cars were of higher quality than the PS03 and they may run in the Minardi colours for 2004. In August of that year, Jos Verstappen tested the A23 at Mugello Circuit to assess its suitability.

In July, Wilson was signed by Jaguar Racing and replaced outgoing driver Antonio Pizzonia.  Minardi quickly signed Nicolas Kiesa, who did not score any points but finished all five Grand Prix he competed in driving the PS03. 

Minardi would ultimately finish in last place in the Constructors' Championship.

Financial difficulties and sponsorship
Minardi started the year with a primarily black car, featuring heavy sponsorship from owner Paul Stoddart's European Aviation brand.  Alongside this were new deals with Gazprom and Superfund. Gazprom defaulted on their payments and were removed from the car before the 2003 Austrian Grand Prix.  At this time, Dutch business Trust upped their sponsorship and the car gained a black & white split livery.

At the beginning of the season, there were on-going discussions between team bosses and the FIA about the distribution of revenue. Ron Dennis and Frank Williams were particularly against supporting Minardi, and this was heavily criticised by then FIA president Max Mosley.

Part way through the season, Bernie Ecclestone bought a minority shareholding in the team. By October, Italian newspaper La Gazzetta dello Sport claimed Minardi had been sold for 2004, this was later refuted by owner Stoddart.

Complete Formula One results 
(key)

References 

 

Minardi Formula One cars
2003 Formula One season cars